Jean-Louis Dauris (27 January 1920 – 2 October 1996) was a French sailor. He competed in the Star event at the 1952 Summer Olympics.

References

External links
 

1920 births
1996 deaths
French male sailors (sport)
Olympic sailors of France
Sailors at the 1952 Summer Olympics – Star
Sportspeople from Marseille